Line 5 of the Nanning Metro is a rapid transit line in Nanning which opened on 16 December 2021. The line is 20.2 km long with 17 stations and uses driverless 6-car Type B trains.

Opening timeline

Stations

References

05
Railway lines opened in 2021
2021 establishments in China